The 1987 Dwars door België was the 42nd edition of the Dwars door Vlaanderen cycle race and was held on 26 March 1987. The race started and finished in Waregem. The race was won by Jelle Nijdam.

General classification

References

1987
1987 in road cycling
1987 in Belgian sport
March 1987 sports events in Europe